The  are awards presented annually by the All Nippon Producers Association (ANPA) in Japan to recognize outstanding achievements in domestic motion pictures and television.

The first ceremony was held in 1956. Up until 1960, the Elan d'or Awards focused on only the Newcomer of the Year category. The other five categories were officially added in 2001.

The 2020 awards were held on 17 January 2020.

Categories
Awards are presented in the following categories. 
Newcomer of the Year
Best Work
Elan d'or Association Award
Best Producer
Special Prize

See also

 List of Asian television awards

References

External links
  

Japanese film awards
Japanese television awards
Recurring events established in 1956
Annual events in Japan
1956 establishments in Japan
Awards established in 1956